Pinguk River (alternate Iñupiaq language name, Pinauk meaning "hill") is a waterway located on the Seward Peninsula in the U.S. state of Alaska.

River course

The York River rises on the eastern flanks of Brooks Mountain, the highest point in the York Mountains, in the central part of the Teller Quadrangle. It flows in a northeast direction and then confluences with the McKillop River. The river flows through a valley formation of  width. The geological formation reported in the valley consists of slate and is exposed in some stretches of the river. The river bed is strewn with gravel and pebbles of slate and limestone. The gravel and pebbles have their origin in the Kuzitrin series. The limestones are derivatives of the Port Clarence limestones.

The McKillop branch has its source in the limestone hills, which are an eastern arm of the York Mountains. The geological formation in this river valley is made up only of limestones and belongs to the Port Clarence formation.

Minerals
The York River, a branch of the Pinguk River, which rises in the Brooks Mountain, is reported to be rich in tin deposits in its head reaches in the mountains. The river bed is strewn with pebbles, boulders and granites, which is an indication that tin was embedded in granite contact zone in granite formations in the hills. However, no gold has been found in this river valley.

References

Rivers of the Seward Peninsula
Rivers of Alaska
Rivers of Northwest Arctic Borough, Alaska